is a Japanese manga series by Taishi Miyake, which began serialization in Ichijinsha's shōnen manga magazine Comic Rex from 2012 and has been collected in nine tankōbon volumes. Another volume containing material which predated the first Comic Rex chapter was published on May 27, 2014 as Volume 0. An anime television adaptation by Actas aired in Japan between October and December 2016, with the remaining episodes aired on February 5, 2017. A light-novel version by Kei Aramoto began with Volume 1 in August 2020.

Plot
Upon seeing someone ride on a bike, college student Ami Kurata buys a folding bike and takes up cycling with her friend Aoi Niigaki. After meeting experienced cyclists Hinako Saijo, Yayoi Ichinose, and Saki Takamiya, Ami starts going further into the world of road cycling and soon forms her own team, Fortuna.

Characters

A slightly clumsy college student who takes up cycling. She owns a red Pontiankh folding bicycle, which she nicknames "Ponta-kun", and later gets a road bike.

Ami's best friend who owns a Gignt bicycle.

A cyclist whose family runs a Chinese restaurant, a common prank in the series is when she works in her family's restaurant, she is forced to use cosplay as bunny girl or chinese dress to get a better pay.

Hinako's friend who often rides with her.

Hinako's friend, who often rides to various places instead of taking public transport.

Ami's colleague at college who becomes inspired by her to take up cycling herself and later joins Team Fortuna.

Ami's younger sister.

The manager of a local bicycle shop who always wears an alpaca motif.

Media

Manga
Long Riders! began as a series of comic strips which Taishi Miyake contributed to doujinshi LongRiders beginning with issue 2.0 in February 2012. Throughout that year, he also published a number of web comics using the same characters. Publication of the manga version began in Comic Rex magazine from the November 2012 issue (published Sept 27), and included a credit to the LongRiders doujinshi for draft/planning cooperation. Publication in Comic Rex ended in 2018, and resumed in Monthly Bushiroad Magazine in 2019 under the title Long Rider Stories!. Volume 0 of the collected editions contained the early strips from the LongRiders doujinshi, plus all of the web comics.

Anime
An anime television series adaptation was produced by Actas. The first ten episodes aired in Japan between October 8, 2016 and December 24, 2016 and was simulcast by Daisuki and Anime Network. After production delays on episodes 3 and 5 the TV station declined to adjust their schedule, and so the final two episodes were not aired in sequence, and were first broadcast during a marathon session on February 5, 2017. Sentai Filmworks licensed the anime in North America.

Episode list

Notes

References

External links
Official website 
Official anime website 

Actas
Comedy anime and manga
Kadokawa Dwango franchises
Cycling in anime and manga
Ichijinsha manga
Shōnen manga
Sentai Filmworks
Slice of life anime and manga
Muse Communication